Hyde Run is a mobile game developed by Grounding and published by Phoenixx, in commemoration of the 20th anniversary of musician Hyde's solo career.
 It is set in "Neo-Tokyo". In the game, the player is represented by a caricature of Hyde, which they can dress up in various outfits and decorate a room for using items earned in the running game.

Gameplay is described as simple running action, featuring jumping and running on walls.

Starting from August 2022, shortly after the first year anniversary of the game's service, users could register a username and enter the Hyde Run Ranking.

External links
 (ja) Official website

References 

2021 video games
Android (operating system) games
Cyberpunk video games
Endless runner games
Free-to-play video games
IOS games
Video games based on musicians
Video games based on real people